Year 1155 (MCLV) was a common year starting on Saturday (link will display the full calendar) of the Julian calendar.

Events 
 By place 

 Europe 
 Siege of Tortona: German forces capture the citadel of Tortona (after a two-month siege). The city is razed to the ground, including the graves. 
 June 18 – King Frederick I (Barbarossa) is crowned as Emperor of the Holy Roman Empire by Pope Adrian IV at St. Peter's Basilica in Rome.
 Arnold of Brescia is exiled by Adrian IV and forced to flee. He is arrested by imperial forces; hanged and his body burned at the stake in Rome.
 The city of Bari rebels against King William I (the Bad) of Sicily and recognizes the Byzantine emperor, Manuel I (Komnenos), as its overlord.
 The Virgin of Vladimir (or Our Lady of Vladimir) is taken by Grand Prince Andrey Bogolyubsky to Vladimir from Suzdal.

 England 
 Spring – King Henry II has the Palace of Westminster (which is badly damaged by Stephen's supporters during The Anarchy) repaired. Thomas Becket, archbishop of Canterbury, is given the task of repairing the buildings. 
 Henry II subdues the English nobles who have become too powerful during the civil war. He takes Bridgnorth Castle and Scarborough Castle.
 Henry II grants the city of Bristol (or Brycgstow) a Royal charter, and is divided between Gloucestershire and Somerset (until 1373).
 New Year's Day is changed from January 1 to March 25.

 Asia 
 August 22 – The 16-year-old Emperor Konoe dies after a 14-year reign. He is succeeded by his brother Go-Shirakawa as the 77th emperor of Japan. 
 Jaisalmer Fort, located in the Indian state Rajasthan, is constructed by the Rajput ruler Rawal Jaisal (approximate date).
 By topic 

 Religion 
 A plan to conquer Ireland is approved by Adrian IV in a Papal Bull (a formal proclamation issued by the pope) called Laudabiliter. It gives Henry II lordship over Ireland, but the Irish kings resist English rule.
 Summer – Robert of Chichester becomes bishop of Exeter (until 1160).

Births 
 February 28 – Henry the Young King, son of Henry II (d. 1183)
 May 17 – Jien, Japanese poet and historian (d. 1225)
 November 11 – Alfonso VIII, king of Castile (d. 1214)
 Abu Muhammad Salih, Almohad Sufi leader (d. 1234)
 Benkei, Japanese warrior monk (sōhei) (d. 1189)
 Bernard d'Armagnac, French nobleman (d. 1202)
 Fujiwara no Ariie, Japanese nobleman (d. 1216) 
 Fujiwara no Yasuhira, Japanese nobleman (d. 1189)
 Geoffrey de Saye, English nobleman (d. 1230)
 Kamo no Chōmei, Japanese waka poet (d. 1216)
 Maud de Braose, English noblewoman (d. 1210)
 Ottokar I, duke of Bohemia (approximate date)
 Sicard of Cremona, Italian prelate (d. 1215)
 Taira no Tokuko, Japanese empress (d. 1214)

Deaths 
 June 4 – Baldwin de Redvers, English nobleman
 June 10 – Sigurd II, king of Norway (b. 1133)
 June 11 – Kenkai, Japanese Buddhist monk (b. 1107)
 August 22 – Konoe, emperor of Japan (b. 1139)
 November 18 – Qin Hui, Chinese politician (b. 1090)
 Arnold of Brescia, Italian priest and rebel (b. 1090)
 Fujiwara no Akisuke, Japanese nobleman (b. 1090)
 Geoffrey of Monmouth, English historian (b. 1095)
 Li Qingzhao, Chinese poet and writer (b. 1084)
 Minamoto no Yoshikuni, Japanese samurai (b. 1082)
 William de Mohun, English nobleman (b. 1090)

References